SUSE Linux is a computer operating system developed by SUSE. It is built on top of the free and open source Linux kernel and is distributed with system and application software from other open source projects. SUSE Linux is of German origin, its name being an acronym of "Software und System-Entwicklung" (software and systems development), and it was mainly developed in Europe. The first version appeared in early 1994, making SUSE one of the oldest existing commercial distributions. It is known for its YaST configuration tool.

Novell bought the SUSE (then "SuSE") brands and trademarks in 2003. Novell, one of the founding members of the Open Invention Network, decided to make the community an important part of their development process by opening widely the distribution development to outside contributors in 2005, creating the openSUSE distribution and the openSUSE Project. Novell employed more than 500 developers working on SUSE in 2004. On 27 April 2011, Novell (and SUSE) were acquired by The Attachmate Group, which made SUSE an independent business unit. Later, in October 2014, the entire Attachmate Group, including SUSE, was acquired by the British firm Micro Focus International. SUSE continues to operate as an independent business unit. On 2 July 2018, it was announced that Micro Focus would sell SUSE to Blitz 18-679 GmbH, a subsidiary of EQT Partners, for $2.535 billion. The acquisition was completed on March 18, 2019.

History

The developer
The developing Gesellschaft für Software und System Entwicklung mbH (Lit. Company for Software and System Development) was founded on 2 September 1992 in Nuremberg, Germany, by Roland Dyroff, Thomas Fehr, Burchard Steinbild, and Hubert Mantel. Three of the founders were still mathematics students at a university; Fehr had already graduated and was working as a software engineer.

The original idea was that the company would develop software and function as an advisory UNIX group. According to Mantel, the group decided to distribute Linux, offering support.

Their name at founding was "S.u.S.E." (Software und System-Entwicklung "Software and systems development"); however, the full name has never been used. "S.u.S.E." was shortened to "SuSE" in October 1998 and restylized to "SUSE" in 2003.

The official logo and current mascot of the distribution is a veiled chameleon officially named GEEKO (a portmanteau of "gecko" and "geek"). As with the company's name, the GEEKO logo has evolved to reflect company name changes.

Origins
The company started as a service provider, regularly releasing software packages that included Softlanding Linux System (SLS, now defunct) and Slackware and printing UNIX and Linux manuals, and offering technical assistance.

These third-party products SUSE initially used had those characteristics and were managed by SUSE in different fashions:
 In mid-1992, Peter MacDonald created the comprehensive Linux distribution known as SLS, which offered elements such as X and TCP/IP. This was distributed to people who wanted to get Linux via floppy disks.
 In 1993, Patrick Volkerding cleaned up the SLS Linux distribution, releasing a newer version as Slackware.
 In 1994, with help from Patrick Volkerding, Slackware scripts were translated into German, which was marked as the first release of S.u.S.E. Linux 1.0 distribution. It was available first on floppies, and then on CDs.

To build its own Linux distribution, S.u.S.E. used SLS in 1992 and jurix in 1996 as starting point. This was created by Florian La Roche, who joined the S.u.S.E. team. He began to develop YaST, the installer and configuration tool that would become the central point of the distribution.

In 1996, the first distribution under the name S.u.S.E. Linux was published as S.u.S.E. Linux 4.2, a reference to the answer to "The Ultimate Question of Life, the Universe and Everything" from the Hitchhiker's Guide to the Galaxy. YaST's first version number, 0.42, was a similar reference.

Expansion

Over time, SuSE Linux incorporated many aspects of Red Hat Linux, such as its RPM Package Manager and its file structure.

S.u.S.E. became the largest Linux distributor in Germany. In 1997, SuSE, LLC was established under the direction of president and managing partner James Gray in Oakland, California, which enabled the company to develop Linux markets in the Americas and Asia. While Red Hat was ubiquitous in the United States, SuSE Linux continued to grow in Germany as well as in Nordic countries such as Finland and Sweden. In October 1998, the name was changed officially to, SuSE (without dots). Linus Torvalds, the creator of the Linux kernel, used it fairly often. SuSE entered the UK in 1999.

In 2001, the company was forced to reduce its staff significantly in order to survive.

Novell

On 4 November 2003, Novell announced it would acquire SuSE Linux AG for $210 million. The acquisition was finalized in January 2004.

In a move to reach its business audience more effectively, SuSE introduced the SUSE Linux Enterprise Server in 2001, and a few months before Novell's purchase, changed the company name to "SUSE Linux". "SUSE" is now a name, not an acronym.

According to J. Philips, Novell's corporate technology strategist for the Asia Pacific region, Novell would not "in the medium term" alter the way in which SUSE was developed. At Novell's annual BrainShare conference in 2004, for the first time, all of their computers were run with SUSE Linux and it was announced that the proprietary SUSE administration program YaST2 would be released under the GPL license.

The openSUSE Project
On 4 August 2005, Novell announced that the SUSE Professional series would become more open, with the launch of the openSUSE Project community. The software always had been open source, but openSUSE opened the development process, allowing developers and users to test and develop it. Previously, all development work had been accomplished in-house by SUSE. Version 10.0 was the first version that offered public beta testing.

SUSE Linux 10.0 included both open source and proprietary applications and retail boxed-set editions. As part of the change, YaST Online Update server access became free for all SUSE Linux users, and also for the first time, the GNOME desktop was upgraded to equal status with the traditional KDE.

In November 2005, SUSE founder Hubert Mantel announced his resignation from the company. He stated that Novell's acquisition had changed SUSE beyond his expectations and that he did not believe it was the same company that he had founded 13 years earlier. The resignation apparently stemmed from a dispute over the implementation of Ximian products in the GNOME-based default desktop environment for the Linux distribution.
He re-joined only a year later.

Microsoft agreement
On 3 November 2006 (renewed 25 July 2011), Novell signed an agreement with Microsoft covering improvement of SUSE's ability to interoperate with Microsoft Windows, cross-promotion/marketing of both products and patent cross-licensing. The agreement is considered controversial by some in the Free Software community.

The Attachmate Group takeover
On 22 November 2010, Novell announced that it had agreed to acquisition by The Attachmate Group for $2.2 billion. The Attachmate Group plans to operate Novell as two units with SUSE becoming a stand-alone business, and it anticipates no change to the relationship between the SUSE business and the openSUSE project as a result of this transaction.

The U.S. Department of Justice announced that in order to proceed with the first phase of their acquisition of certain patents and patent applications from Novell Inc., CPTN Holdings LLC and its owners would have to alter their original agreements to address the department's antitrust concerns. The department said that, as originally proposed, the deal would jeopardize the ability of open source software, such as Linux, to continue to innovate and compete in the development and distribution of server, desktop, and mobile operating systems as well as middleware and virtualization products.

Stipulations regarding the licensing the patents were:
 All of the Novell patents will be acquired subject to the GNU General Public License, Version 2, a widely adopted open-source license, and the Open Invention Network (OIN) License, a significant license for the Linux System;
 CPTN does not have the right to limit which of the patents, if any, are available under the OIN license; and
 Neither CPTN nor its owners will make any statement or take any action with the purpose of influencing or encouraging either Novell or Attachmate to modify which of the patents are available under the OIN license.

The acquisition was completed on 27 April 2011. Subsequently, on 23 July 2011 The Attachmate Group launched a new website for the SUSE business.

Micro Focus merger
On 20 November 2014, the Attachmate Group merged with Micro Focus to form the Micro Focus Group. SUSE is operated as a separate business unit with a dedicated product portfolio.

EQT Partners acquisition
On 2 July 2018, it was announced that Micro Focus would sell its SUSE business segment to EQT Partners for $2.535 billion. The acquisition was completed on March 18, 2019.

Versions
SUSE provides a thirteen-year product life cycle for SUSE Linux Enterprise 11 & 12.

SUSE distributions

SUSE Linux Enterprise Server

SUSE family products
SUSE Linux is available under two brands, openSUSE and SUSE Linux Enterprise. openSUSE is a free, community distribution driven by the openSUSE Project. It includes some of the latest "bleeding edge" Linux technologies and is designed for home users and enthusiasts. SUSE Linux Enterprise is Suse's tested and certified open-source solution for major enterprises.

openSUSE vs SUSE Linux Enterprise
openSUSE is a freely available, community project that releases versions on a comparatively frequent basis, and generally uses the latest versions of the various open source projects that it includes.

SUSE Linux Enterprise is SUSE's commercial edition, which SUSE releases much less frequently, enabling it to offer support more effectively for enterprise and production deployments. It is certified for a wide variety of enterprise applications and offers a number of special enterprise features including, High Availability and Point of Sale extensions. SUSE historically uses a heavily tested subset of packages from openSUSE Linux as the basis for SUSE Linux Enterprise. Starting with openSUSE 15, SUSE made its "Leap" variant directly upgradable to SUSE Linux Enterprise.

SUSE Linux Enterprise Server vs Desktop
SUSE offers SUSE Linux Enterprise Server and SUSE Linux Enterprise Desktop. Each focuses on packages that fit its specific purpose. For example, SUSE Linux Enterprise Desktop does not include the Apache Web Server, and SUSE Linux Enterprise Server does not include Xgl/Compiz.

In contrast, openSUSE does not have separate distributions for server, desktop, and tablets. Rather, its repositories contain the needed software, and use installation patterns to accomplish the same.

openSUSE Linux

openSUSE is driven by the openSUSE Project community and sponsored by SUSE, to develop and maintain SUSE Linux components. It is the equivalent of the historic "SuSE Linux Professional". After their acquisition of SUSE Linux, Novell (now SUSE) decided to make the community central to their development process.

It has a theoretical development cycle of 8 months and a lifetime (duration of the critical updates) of 18 months from the date of release. It is fully and freely available for immediate download.

openSUSE was the sixth most popular Linux distribution for 2013 and the fourth most popular for 2014, according to DistroWatch.

SUSE Linux Enterprise

SUSE develops multiple products for its "enterprise" business line. These business products target corporate environments, with a higher life cycle (10 years, extendable to 13), a longer development cycle (6 to 18 months), a guarantee of stability at the potential expense of development speed, technical support, and certification by independent hardware and software vendors. SUSE Linux Enterprise products are only available for sale (updates fees).

SUSE Linux Enterprise has fewer packages than the openSUSE distribution. Most of the differences are desktop applications that are more suited to consumers than to business. The enterprise products are:
 SUSE Linux Enterprise Server (SLES) is a server-oriented operating system targeted at corporate environments.
 SUSE Linux Enterprise Real Time is a modified version of SLES supporting low-latency operations where the time factor is critical.
 SUSE Linux Enterprise Desktop (SLED) is a desktop-oriented operating system targeted at corporate environments.
 SUSE Linux Enterprise Thin Client (SLETC) is a modified version of SLED targeted at thin client terminals.

When installed using a Linux kernel, Novell Open Enterprise Server (OES) uses SUSE Linux Enterprise Server as a platform. This product is also known as OES-Linux.

SUSE Linux Enterprise was included with VMware's vSphere licensing, up until June 25, 2014 for 'free', as noted on SUSE Partners website

SUSE Studio

SUSE's SUSE Studio product was a web interface (built using Ruby on Rails) to openSUSE's KIWI and the Open Build Service tools. It allowed users to put together a custom Linux distribution graphically and to generate output including a large variety of Virtual Machine and Disk Images. SUSE Studio merged with Open Build Service and the resulting project was renamed to SUSE Studio Express in September 2017.

See also
 Linux on IBM Z
 List of Linux distributions
 Comparison of Linux distributions
 SUSE Studio
 Novell UnixWare
 Novell Corsair
 Novell Exposé
 Caldera OpenLinux and Caldera Network Desktop
 List of computing mascots

References

Citations

General sources

External links

 SUSE
 openSUSE.org
 Planet SUSE
 
 

 
RPM-based Linux distributions
Linux distributions